Gressenhall is a village and civil parish in the English county of Norfolk.

The villages name origin is uncertain possibly 'Grassy nook of land' or 'gravelly nook of land'.

For the purposes of local government, it falls within the district of Breckland.

The village is on the River Nar close to East Dereham in Norfolk.

History
The Gressenhall Farm and Workhouse museum is located here, and a watermill dating from 1847.
The main buildings of the Gressenhall workhouse were built in 1777 when it was a house of industry. Here paupers would work under quite a strict regime in return for accommodation.

This changed after the Poor Law Amendment Act of 1834: as a result the building underwent numerous changes to comply with the Act. The workhouse was a poor law institution. Its purpose was to provide a home and work for the poor local people who had nowhere to live. Gressenhall was constructed in 1776 and took one year to open.

Gressenhall has a post office, a pub (The Swan) and a church (St Mary's).

Notable residents 
Sir Jerome Alexander (died 1670), a High Court judge in Ireland  noted for his severe sentences in criminal cases,  was born in Gressenhall about 1590.
Alsager Hay Hill, a notable Victorian social reformer was born at Gressenhall Hall in 1839.
Dr Sean Radford, CEO and Founder of World renowned AI training app TrainAsONE. Noted for his contribution to health and wellbeing research with leading UK and US universities. 
Dr James Robert Murray, a co-Founder of Shire Pharmaceuticals, was the family doctor in the village from 1969 to 1976. He moved from Norfolk to Holland to start his career in pharmaceuticals. An Honorary President of Dereham RFC, in 2020, he published a fictional work about village life in 1970s Norfolk.

References

 http://kepn.nottingham.ac.uk/map/place/Norfolk/Gressenhall

External links

Gressenhall Village and Parish Council Website

 
Villages in Norfolk
Civil parishes in Norfolk
Breckland District